Herbert Kirkland Woodhead (2 April 1888 – 16 June 1961) was an Australian rules footballer who played with Richmond in the Victorian Football League (VFL).

Notes

External links 

1888 births
1961 deaths
Australian rules footballers from Victoria (Australia)
Richmond Football Club players